Torger Motland (born 26 March 1985 in Hommersåk) is a Norwegian football striker who currently plays for Riska FK. His previous clubs include Viking, Stavanger, Bryne, Mandalskameratene, FH Hafnarfjörður and Ålgård.

He started his career in Riska, and also played youth football for Sandnes Ulf and Viking. His first senior club was Bryne, on loan from Viking.

When he was in Viking he was used as a substitute in one game in Norwegian Premier League.

Career statistics

References

1985 births
Living people
People from Sandnes
Norwegian footballers
Norwegian expatriate footballers
Viking FK players
Bryne FK players
Mandalskameratene players
Stavanger IF players
Fimleikafélag Hafnarfjarðar players
Randaberg IL players
Ålgård FK players
Eliteserien players
Norwegian First Division players
Norwegian expatriate sportspeople in Iceland
Expatriate footballers in Iceland
Association football midfielders
Sportspeople from Rogaland